Indian Rupee is a 2011 Indian Malayalam satirical film written and directed by Ranjith Balakrishnan, and produced by August Cinema. The film stars Prithviraj Sukumaran, Thilakan, Tini Tom and Jagathy Sreekumar in significant roles.

The film was released on 26 October 2011 coinciding with Diwali and to a positive response from critics. It received numerous accolades including National Film Award for Best Feature Film in Malayalam and Kerala State Film Award for Best Film.

Plot
Indian Rupee is a satirical dig on making quick money without sweating it out and youth blindly follows on such examples. Jayaprakash or JP is a small-time real estate dealer based in Calicut, who dreams of making it big someday. JP is a school drop-out and in love with his cousin Beena who is a doctor, which is unknown to her parents. JP along with his partner CH is scouting for land deals. He is working under a senior agent Raayin but wishes to break free as soon as possible. He believes that his fortunes are up for a change, when Achutha Menon, an old widower approaches him to sell off his first son's land assets, the deal never happens. Achutha Menon stays with JP and CH, he became a part of their life. Things start happening in a fantastic way for JP, soon after. JP manages to earn a decent fortune after some smart moves and tricks, but he learns some valuable lessons by the end of the process. The person whom JP tried to cheat, "Golden" Pappan, helps him out in this. Jayaprakash later vows to make money from an honest day's work, instead of through tricky deals.

Cast

The film featured cameo appearances from Joju George, Asif Ali, Fahadh Faasil, and Augustine.

Soundtrack

The audio release function was held at Puliyarmala Krishna Gowdar hall, Kalpetta, Wayanad on 23 August 2011. The song Ee Puzhayum Sandhyakalum from the film was the last song of the veteran poet-cum-lyricist Mullanezhi, who died soon after the film was released.

Reception
The film opened to positive reviews from critics. Reviewers have praised Ranjith Balakrishnan in presenting such an "oft-told story" in such a refreshing way.

Deccan Chronicle said, "Touching a thriving social chord of life, Indian Rupee is a movie minus drama packed with the intricacies of life's realities." Rediff.com observed – "Indian Rupee should be seen by people who think that good stories have vanished from films. Ranjith has just told the story of contemporary Kerala society in a most interesting way." Nowrunning.com commented: "The details are downright gripping, the asides sparkling and the setups almost surreal, so much so that Indian Rupee hops straight into the year's must-see movies list and scrambles right up to the top". the site added that it is as easily one of the best performances from Prithviraj, and says that "Indian Rupee would as much be remembered for Prithviraj the actor, as the actor would be remembered for the film."

Sify.com wrote -"Though it is a bit too melodramatic and even preachy at times, Indian Rupee is easily one of the finest films of the year. It has honesty written all over it and such efforts need to be seen and appreciated by the audience."

Box office
The film has taken  2.5 crore as distributor's share from theatres.

Accolades
 National Film Awards (2011)
 Best Feature Film in Malayalam

 Kerala State Film Awards (2011)
 Best Film

Filmfare Awards South
 Best Supporting Actor - Malayalam - Thilakan
 Best Playback Singer (Male) - Malayalam - "Ee Puzhayum" - Vijay Yesudas

 Asianet Film Awards
 Best Director – Ranjith Balakrishnan

References

External links
 
 

2011 films
Films scored by Shahabaz Aman
2010s Malayalam-language films
2010s satirical films
Indian satirical films
Films directed by Ranjith
Films shot in Kozhikode
Best Malayalam Feature Film National Film Award winners
2011 drama films